In mathematics, the homology or cohomology of an algebra may refer to

Banach algebra cohomology of a bimodule over a Banach algebra
Cyclic homology of an associative algebra
Group cohomology of a module over a group ring or a representation of a group
Hochschild homology of a bimodule over an associative algebra
 Lie algebra cohomology of a module over a Lie algebra
Supplemented algebra cohomology of a module over a supplemented associative algebra

See also
Cohomology
Ext functor
Tor functor

Homological algebra